The Weightlifting Competition at the 2006 Central American and Caribbean Games was held in Cartagena, Colombia from July 15 to July 20, 2006. The event was open to both men and women.

Medal summary

Men

Women

Men's competition

Bantamweight (– 56 kg)

Featherweight (– 62 kg)

Lightweight (– 69 kg)

Middleweight (– 77 kg)

Light-Heavyweight (– 85 kg)

Middle-Heavyweight (– 94 kg)

Heavyweight (– 105 kg)

Super-Heavyweight (+ 105 kg)

Women's competition

Flyweight (– 48 kg)

Featherweight (– 53 kg)

Lightweight (– 58 kg)

Middleweight (– 63 kg)

Light-Heavyweight (– 69 kg)

Heavyweight (– 75 kg)

Super-Heavyweight (+ 75 kg)

See also
Weightlifting at the 2007 Pan American Games

References
Results
 Official Results

Central American and Caribbean Games
2006 Central American and Caribbean Games
2006
2006 Central American and Caribbean Games